Jealous Gods is the sixth studio album by the Finnish rock band Poets of the Fall. It was released on 19 September 2014. The record debuted at number-one on the Finnish Top 40 album chart.

Track listing

References

2014 albums
Poets of the Fall albums